William Bundey (26 January 1826 – 2 April 1889) was Mayor of Adelaide, South Australia from 1883 to 1886.

Bundey was born in Beaulieu, Hampshire. On 12 June 1848 he married Elizabeth Brandis at St James Church, Paddington, London.

The family emigrated to South Australia, arriving on 19 November 1848.

He is buried in Walkerville cemetery, Adelaide.

References

Mayors and Lord Mayors of Adelaide
1826 births
1889 deaths
19th-century Australian politicians